Barrington Francis (born 12 August 1965 in Kingston, Jamaica) is a Jamaican-Canadian professional feather/super feather/lightweight boxer who competed from 1985 to 1997.

Biography

Barrington Francis was born 12 August 1965 in Kingston, Jamaica. He came to Canada in 1972 at the age of 7 and as a citizen for many years turned professional at the age of 19 in Montreal, Canada. As a professional fighter in Montreal, he won Eastern Canadian and Canadian national (CPBF) titles in 1986 and 1988. He moved to Toronto in 1990 and in the process won NABC, Commonwealth and relinquished all other titles to become WBF world Champion in 1991. He was fighter of the year in 1988 for the Canadian professional boxing federation, Fighter of the year in 1992 for the WBF world title and the last Canadian official CPBF champion ever.

References

External links
 

1965 births
Sportspeople from Kingston, Jamaica
Black Canadian boxers
Lightweight boxers
Featherweight boxers
Super-featherweight boxers
Boxers from Montreal
Living people
Jamaican emigrants to Canada
Canadian male boxers
Anglophone Quebec people